{{DISPLAYTITLE:Sigma2 Gruis}}

Sigma2 Gruis is a binary star system in the southern constellation of Grus. Its apparent visual magnitude is 5.86. The pair had an angular separation of 2.7 arc seconds along a position angle of 265°, as of 1991. Located around  distant, the white-hued primary component is an A-type main-sequence star of spectral type A1V, a star that is currently fusing its core hydrogen.

References

A-type main-sequence stars
Grus (constellation)
Gruis, Sigma2
214150
111643
8602
Durchmusterung objects